The 1963 Tasmanian Australian National Football League (TANFL) premiership season was an Australian Rules football competition staged in Hobart, Tasmania over nineteen (19) roster rounds and four (4) finals series matches between 6 April and 14 September 1963.

Participating Clubs
Clarence District Football Club
Glenorchy District Football Club
Hobart Football Club
New Norfolk District Football Club
North Hobart Football Club
Sandy Bay Football Club

1963 TANFL Club Coaches
Stuart Spencer (Clarence)
John Chick (Glenorchy)
Mal Pascoe (Hobart)
Trevor Leo (New Norfolk)
Darrell Eaton (North Hobart)
Rex Geard (Sandy Bay)

TANFL Reserves Grand Final
Glenorchy 15.14 (104) v New Norfolk 11.8 (74) – North Hobart Oval

TANFL Under-19's Grand Final
State Schools Old Boys Football Association (SSOBFA)
Clarence 10.11 (71) v Glenorchy 6.8 (44) – New Town Oval

State Preliminary Final
(Saturday, 28 September 1963)
Burnie Tigers: 7.2 (44) | 9.3 (57) | 15.7 (97) | 16.10 (106)
Hobart: 1.2 (8) | 6.9 (45) | 7.12 (54) | 11.17 (83)
Attendance: 6,500 at West Park Oval
Note: Burnie (NWFU guernsey) and Hobart (TANFL guernsey) wore alternate strips due to a guernsey clash.

State Grand Final
(Saturday, 5 October 1963)
Burnie Tigers: 2.7 (19) | 6.14 (50) | 8.16 (64) | 8.25 (73)
Nth Launceston: 1.3 (9) | 1.4 (10) | 2.10 (22) | 6.13 (49)
Attendance: 6,490 at York Park

Intrastate Matches
Jubilee Shield (Saturday, 4 May 1963) 
TANFL 25.16 (166) v NTFA 13.14 (92) – Att: 10,590 at North Hobart Oval

Jubilee Shield (Saturday, 29 June 1963)
NWFU 19.9 (123) v TANFL 11.15 (81) – Att: 7,300 at Devonport Oval

Inter-Association Match (Saturday, 4 May 1963)
TANFL 17.24 (126) v Queenstown FA 7.7 (49) – Att: 10,590 at North Hobart Oval (Curtain-Raiser)

Interstate Matches
Interstate Match (Saturday, 1 June 1963)
South Australia 18.29 (137) v Tasmania 5.1 (31) – Att: 14,898 at Adelaide Oval, South Australia

Interstate Match (Saturday, 8 June 1963)
Tasmania 9.10 (64) v Western Australia 6.13 (49) – Att: 20,000 at Subiaco Oval

Leading Goalkickers: TANFL
Peter Hudson (New Norfolk) – 79
Stuart Palfreyman (Sandy Bay) – 71
John Mills (Clarence) – 61
Burnie Payne (Hobart) – 52
Mal Pascoe (Hobart) – 41

Medal Winners
Geoff Whitton (Sandy Bay) – William Leitch Medal
Dal Johnson (Glenorchy) – George Watt Medal (Reserves)
Graham Glover (New Norfolk) – V.A Geard Medal (Under-19's)
R.Reid (Clarence) – Weller Arnold Medal (Best player in Intrastate matches)

1963 TANFL Ladder

Round 1
(Saturday, 6 April 1963)
Clarence 14.13 (97) v Glenorchy 11.9 (75) – Att: 4,891 at North Hobart Oval
Nth Hobart 8.13 (61) v Sandy Bay 8.7 (55) – Att: 3,651 at Queenborough Oval
Hobart 17.14 (116) v New Norfolk 11.12 (78) – Att: 2,241 at Boyer Oval

Round 2
(Saturday, 13 April & Monday, 15 April 1963)
Sandy Bay 12.19 (91) v Hobart 12.10 (82) – Att: 3,970 at North Hobart Oval
New Norfolk 16.16 (112) v Glenorchy 9.6 (60) – Att: 2,428 at KGV Park
Clarence 9.11 (65) v Nth Hobart 7.11 (53) – Att: 6,358 at North Hobart Oval (Monday)

Round 3
(Saturday, 20 April 1963)
Nth Hobart 11.8 (74) v Hobart 11.8 (74) – Att: 3,984 at North Hobart Oval
Glenorchy 13.7 (85) v Sandy Bay 12.11 (83) – Att: 2,792 at Queenborough Oval
New Norfolk 9.15 (69) v Clarence 8.13 (61) – Att: 3,544 at Bellerive Oval

Round 4
(Saturday, 27 April 1963)
New Norfolk 11.9 (75) v Sandy Bay 9.12 (66) – Att: 3,845 at North Hobart Oval
Hobart 16.14 (110) v Clarence 11.9 (75) – Att: 3,067 at TCA Ground
Nth Hobart 6.12 (48) v Glenorchy 6.11 (47) – Att: 3,050 at KGV Park

Round 5
(Saturday, 11 May 1963)
Hobart 13.14 (92) v Glenorchy 10.9 (69) – Att: 4,243 at North Hobart Oval
Sandy Bay 13.10 (88) v Clarence 12.15 (87) – Att: 3,265 at Bellerive Oval
New Norfolk 11.6 (72) v Nth Hobart 5.8 (38) – Att: 3,319 at Boyer Oval

Round 6
(Saturday, 18 May 1963)
Nth Hobart 13.15 (93) v Sandy Bay 11.9 (75) – Att: 3,948 at North Hobart Oval
New Norfolk 15.16 (106) v Hobart 13.8 (86) – Att: 3,456 at TCA Ground
Clarence 17.12 (114) v Glenorchy 7.13 (55) – Att: 2,921 at KGV Park

Round 7
(Saturday, 25 May 1963)
New Norfolk 11.9 (75) v Glenorchy 8.15 (63) – Att: 3,546 at North Hobart Oval
Sandy Bay 16.18 (114) v Hobart 11.11 (77) – Att: 3,106 at Queenborough Oval
Clarence 10.15 (75) v Nth Hobart 9.11 (65) – Att: 3,146 at Bellerive Oval

Round 8
(Saturday, 1 June 1963)
Sandy Bay 13.12 (90) v Glenorchy 7.13 (55) – Att: 3,887 at North Hobart Oval
Nth Hobart 12.10 (82) v Hobart 9.15 (69) – Att: 2,623 at TCA Ground
Clarence 15.7 (97) v New Norfolk 13.11 (89) – Att: 3,324 at Boyer Oval

Round 9
(Saturday, 8 June & Monday, 10 June 1963)
Clarence 14.14 (98) v Hobart 10.19 (79) – Att: 4,953 at North Hobart Oval
Sandy Bay 12.13 (85) v New Norfolk 10.10 (70) – Att: 3,015 at Boyer Oval
Glenorchy 12.5 (77) v Nth Hobart 10.8 (68) – Att: 4,634 at North Hobart Oval (Monday)

Round 10
(Saturday, 15 June 1963)
Nth Hobart 13.7 (85) v New Norfolk 10.11 (71) – Att: 4,047 at North Hobart Oval
Clarence 11.10 (76) v Sandy Bay 10.8 (68) – Att: 4,222 at Queenborough Oval
Hobart 11.14 (80) v Glenorchy 8.9 (57) – Att: 2,669 at KGV Park

Round 11
(Saturday, 22 June 1963)
Hobart 11.11 (77) v New Norfolk 10.7 (67) – Att: 3,698 at North Hobart Oval
Sandy Bay 9.16 (70) v Nth Hobart 5.7 (37) – Att: 3,968 at Queenborough Oval
Clarence 12.15 (87) v Glenorchy 8.13 (61) – Att: 2,813 at Bellerive Oval

Round 12
(Saturday, 29 June 1963)
Clarence 8.14 (62) v Nth Hobart 8.12 (60) – Att: 4,092 at North Hobart Oval
Sandy Bay 15.11 (101) v Hobart 13.10 (88) – Att: 2,665 at TCA Ground
New Norfolk 10.16 (76) v Glenorchy 7.7 (49) – Att: 2,094 at Boyer Oval

Round 13
(Saturday, 6 July 1963)
Hobart 9.13 (67) v Nth Hobart 9.9 (63) – Att: 3,995 at North Hobart Oval
Sandy Bay 13.13 (91) v Glenorchy 5.7 (37) – Att: 2,219 at KGV Park
New Norfolk 13.11 (89) v Clarence 8.10 (58) – Att: 3,547 at Bellerive Oval

Round 14
(Saturday, 13 July 1963)
Hobart 10.19 (79) v Clarence 3.8 (26) – Att: 3,186 at North Hobart Oval
Nth Hobart 7.6 (48) v Glenorchy 4.5 (29) – Att: 1,591 at KGV Park
Sandy Bay 9.5 (59) v New Norfolk 6.9 (45) – Att: 2,512 at Queenborough Oval

Round 15
(Saturday, 20 July 1963)
Clarence 9.7 (61) v Sandy Bay 8.8 (56) – Att: 5,069 at North Hobart Oval
Hobart 16.15 (111) v Glenorchy 8.9 (57) – Att: 1,580 at TCA Ground
New Norfolk 9.12 (66) v Nth Hobart 8.12 (60) – Att: 2,720 at Boyer Oval

Round 16
(Saturday, 27 July 1963)
Hobart 15.13 (103) v New Norfolk 10.16 (76) – Att: 3,285 at TCA Ground
Sandy Bay 15.8 (98) v Nth Hobart 3.10 (28) – Att: 4,349 at Queenborough Oval
Glenorchy 8.9 (57) v Clarence 6.8 (44) – Att: 1,970 at KGV Park

Round 17
(Saturday, 3 August 1963)
Sandy Bay 9.11 (65) v Hobart 8.10 (58) – Att: 5,905 at North Hobart Oval
Nth Hobart 12.11 (83) v Clarence 10.14 (74) – Att: 2,223 at Bellerive Oval
New Norfolk 15.23 (113) v Glenorchy 3.3 (21) – Att: 2,060 at Boyer Oval

Round 18
(Saturday, 10 August 1963)
New Norfolk 10.11 (71) v Clarence 5.17 (47) – Att: 5,691 at North Hobart Oval
Hobart 13.13 (91) v Nth Hobart 11.18 (84) – Att: 2,533 at TCA Ground
Sandy Bay 14.10 (94) v Glenorchy 6.16 (52) – Att: 2,367 at Queenborough Oval

Round 19
(Saturday, 17 August 1963)
Nth Hobart 16.9 (105) v Glenorchy 14.15 (99) – Att: 2,330 at North Hobart Oval
Hobart 9.13 (67) v Clarence 7.11 (53) – Att: 3,186 at Bellerive Oval
New Norfolk 8.21 (69) v Sandy Bay 6.9 (45) – Att: 4,416 at Boyer Oval

First Semi Final
(Saturday, 24 August 1963)
Hobart: 4.1 (25) | 6.5 (41) | 12.6 (78) | 13.9 (87)
Clarence: 1.4 (10) | 5.9 (39) | 8.12 (60) | 10.20 (80)
Attendance: 11,827 at North Hobart Oval

Second Semi Final
(Saturday, 31 August 1963)
Sandy Bay: 2.1 (13) | 7.7 (49) | 11.8 (74) | 15.11 (101)
New Norfolk: 4.2 (26) | 5.2 (32) | 7.9 (51) | 10.9 (69)
Attendance: 13,325 at North Hobart Oval

Preliminary Final
(Saturday, 7 September 1963)
Hobart: 1.9 (15) | 3.13 (31) | 5.16 (46) | 12.19 (91)
New Norfolk: 1.2 (8) | 4.7 (31) | 9.11 (65) | 13.12 (90)
Attendance: 12,434 at North Hobart Oval

Grand Final
(Saturday, 14 September 1963)
Hobart: 3.1 (19) | 4.1 (25) | 7.3 (45) | 10.4 (64)
Sandy Bay: 2.1 (13) | 2.7 (19) | 5.7 (37) | 6.13 (49)
Attendance: 14,498 at North Hobart Oval

Source: All scores and statistics courtesy of the Hobart Mercury and Saturday Evening Mercury (SEM) publications.

Tasmanian Football League seasons